Larry Lund (born September 9, 1940 in Penticton, British Columbia) is a Canadian retired professional ice hockey player who played in the World Hockey Association (WHA) playing 459 games all with the Houston Aeros.

Playing career
Lund was a veteran minor-leaguer, who was more famous for founding Okanagan Hockey School, than as a hockey player, until the World Hockey Association came into existence in 1972. The upstart league presented opportunities not only for high-profile NHL stars, but minor league and players outside North America as well. Signing with the Houston franchise, Lund has said that he went from earning $22,000 in the minors to $150,000 in the WHA.

While never playing in the NHL, Lund had a significant career in the WHA as he won the League Championship Avco Cup twice and finishing at #12 all-time in points. Lund's best season was 1974–75 when he led his team in points with 108, ahead of the legendary Gordie Howe, to finish fifth overall in league points, he participated in the annual All-Star game and his team won the League Championship. In his WHA career, he had 149 goals, 277 assists, with 426 points alongside 20 goals, 25 assists and 45 points in the playoffs.

Lund was the owner of the Barley Mill Brew Pub in Penticton, BC.

Honours
On July 25, 2008, Larry Lund was inducted into the BC Hockey Hall Of Fame.

In 2012, he was inducted into the World Hockey Association Hall of Fame.

References

External links 

 Complete stats at Hockey-reference.com

1940 births
Canadian ice hockey centres
Houston Aeros (WHA) players
Ice hockey people from British Columbia
Living people
Minneapolis Bruins players
Muskegon Zephyrs players
Phoenix Roadrunners (WHL) players
Quebec Aces (AHL) players
San Francisco Seals (ice hockey) players
Seattle Totems (WHL) players
Sportspeople from Penticton
Canadian expatriate ice hockey players in the United States